Thor Leonardo Halvorssen Mendoza (born 1976; , locally ) is a Venezuelan human rights advocate and film producer with contributions in the field of public policy, public interest advocacy, individual rights and civil liberties, and pro-democracy advocacy.

Halvorssen is founder of the annual Oslo Freedom Forum, a human rights conference described by The Economist 2010 as "on its way to becoming a human-rights equivalent of the Davos economic forum". Halvorssen is president of the Human Rights Foundation, an organization that states their mission as to promote freedom against authoritarian regimes.

Halvorssen bought the Norwegian news magazine Ny Tid in May 2010.

Halvorssen's has appeared on television outlets such as Fox News Channel’s The O'Reilly Factor and Hannity & Colmes, MSNBC’s Hardball with Chris Matthews and CNN. Thor Halvorssen was a speaker at TEDx at the University of Pennsylvania in October 2010.

Background
Halvorssen was born in Venezuela to Hilda Mendoza, a descendant and a relative, respectively, of Venezuela's first president Cristóbal Mendoza and liberator Simón Bolívar. His father is Thor Halvorssen Hellum, who served as a Venezuelan Ambassador for anti-Narcotic Affairs in the administration of Carlos Andrés Pérez and as special overseas investigator of a Venezuelan Senate Commission. His family was prosperous and on his father's side he is the grandson of Øystein Halvorssen, who served as Norway's honorary consul-general in Caracas and who "built a family dynasty as the Venezuelan representative for corporations including Dunlop, Alfa Laval and Ericsson." His cousin is Leopoldo Lopez. a Venezuelan politician, activist, and a political prisoner after called for peaceful protests in February 2014.

Halvorssen attended the University of Pennsylvania and graduated Phi Beta Kappa and magna cum laude, with concurrent undergraduate and graduate degrees in Political Science and History. Halvorssen’s father, also named Thor Halvorssen, was a wealthy businessman who was named the CEO of Venezuela's state TV CANTV. In 1989, then-President Carlos Andrés Pérez appointed Halvorssen Sr. as Venezuela’s “anti-drug ambassador.”

When Halvorssen was a freshman at the University of Pennsylvania, in 1993, his father was arrested after a series of bombings around the capital. It was named the 'yuppie' terrorists plot because its planners were allegedly bankers and other gilded elite who hoped that the panic caused by the bombs would help them speculate on the stock market.". His father was working on money laundering cases in the public service and said, Colombian drug traffickers framed the crime on him. His father was beaten during his 74-day incarceration in a Caracas jail. Halvorssen helped the campaign of Amnesty International and other organizations that pressured the Venezuelan authorities to free his father. Halvorssen was eventually found not guilty of all charges. After his release the International Society for Human Rights appointed him director of their Pan-American Committee.

While attending a peaceful protest of the Venezuelan recall referendum of 2004, Halvorssen's mother, Hilda Mendoza Denham, a British subject, was wounded by a gunshot.  Images of government supporters firing upon the demonstrators were captured by a live television broadcast.   The gunmen were later apprehended, tried, had their sentences revoked, tried again, found guilty, and received 3-year sentences for murder and for bodily harm. They were released after serving six months in prison.

Activism
Halvorssen has lectured on the subject of human rights including at Harvard Law School, the New York City Junto, the United Nations Association in New York, and the American Enterprise Institute. Halvorssen has also spoken at the British parliament for the Henry Jackson Society.

Halvorssen testified to the U.S. Congress that he was the target of a smear campaign by Fusion GPS. Halvorssen provided testimony to the U.S. Senate Judiciary Committee in July 2017.

Foundation for Individual Rights in Education
In 1999, Halvorssen became the first executive director and chief executive officer of the Foundation for Individual Rights in Education (FIRE), a U.S. civil liberties organization. As head of FIRE, Halvorssen formed beside with more traditional free speech defenders such as the ACLU also coalitions with advocacy organizations like the Heritage Foundation, Feminists for Free Expression and the Eagle Forum.

In 2001, Halvorssen stated that, "Liberty of opinion, speech, and expression is indispensable to a free and, in the deepest sense, progressive society. Deny it to one, and you deny it effectively to all. These truths long have been ignored and betrayed on our campuses, to the peril of a free society." In a 2003 moderated chat, he said, "History has taught us that a society that does not respect individual rights, freedom of conscience, and freedom of speech will not long survive as a free society in any form."

Human Rights Foundation
Halvorssen stepped down as head of FIRE in March 2004 to join its Board of Advisors and announced the creation of the international group Human Rights Foundation. HRF was incorporated in 2005, opening its headquarters in New York City in August 2006. The chairman is Garry Kasparov. 2005 he was also a founder of the Moving Picture Institute.

At the helm of HRF Halvorssen has repeatedly lobbied and advocated for the release of Chinese political prisoner Liu Xiaobo. Halvorssen is identified as a supporter of Chinese Uyghur leader Rebiya Kadeer and has criticized the Taiwanese Kuomintang government for its banning visits by Kadeer. Halvorssen has supported UN-level action to address the violations of Uyghur rights in China. He has criticised the UN, saying they doing nothing against mass killings. Halvorssen is also a critic of Hugo Chávez.

Halvorssen was part of a symposium by the American conservative magazine National Review to praise Augusto Pinochet, where Halvorssen was the only one also pointing out his human rights abuses. Halvorssen has criticised several celebrities like Jennifer Lopez, Erykah Baduh and Mariah Carey for accepting payments for their performances in countries governed by authoritarian leaders like Russia.

Oslo Freedom Forum

In 2009, Halvorssen founded a gathering of human-rights campaigners and policymakers called the Oslo Freedom Forum. It has taken place in Oslo annually since then. Wired Magazine blogger David Rowan praised the event for its sessions and having sponsors like Peter Thiel, "if the global human-rights movement were to create its own unified representative body, it would look something like this."

The Economist called it 2010 as "on its way to becoming a human-rights equivalent of the Davos economic forum". Prominent participants included Ai Weiwei, Jimmy Wales, Peter Thiel, Garry Kasparov, Leopoldo López and Mikhail Khodorkovskii.

Film
In 2006, Halvorssen executive produced Hammer & Tickle, a film about the power of humor, ridicule, and satire as the language of truth in the Soviet Union. The film won Best New Documentary Film at the Zurich Film Festival.

Halvorssen is a producer of the film The Singing Revolution, a film about Estonia's peaceful struggle for political independence from Soviet occupation. It has with 18.000 viewers become the most successful documentary film in Estonian box-office history.

Filmography

Awards and recognition
John Strausbaugh described as a Halvorssen as a „conservative operating in fields more often associated with liberals .. who champions the underdog“. He points out that Halvorssen backs pro-business, anti-Communist and anti-environmentalist movies. Neoconservative columnist James Kirchick described Halvorssen as having a „burning desire to right the countless injustices of this world“.

University of Pennsylvania president Judith Rodin honored Halvorssen's achievements by awarding him the Sol Feinstone Award for protecting student speech.

In 2010 Romanian leader Emil Constantinescu presented Halvorssen with a presidential silver medal to commemorate the tenth anniversary of the Romanian Revolution of 1989. "On behalf of those who fought and died for freedom, I present this medal to the Oslo Freedom Forum founder, and remind those here that even if Romanians live in democracy now, we cannot feel entirely free as long as other people – who live under dictatorial and repressive regimes anywhere in the world – are not also be free."

In 2018, Halvorssen was awarded the Millennium Candler Justice Prize, honoring leadership in effecting positive social change, presented at the Millennium Gate Museum.

Publications 
 Halvorssen, Thor L (1996). Simón Bolívar and the Enlightenment, University of Pennsylvania.

Notes 
 Halvorssen Mendoza is known commonly as Thor Halvorssen.  Per Venezuelan naming conventions, his full legal name includes both his father's (Halvorssen) and mother's (Mendoza) surnames. His full, legal, Venezuelan name distinguishes him from his father, Thor Halvorssen Hellum. (See Thor Halvorssen - Presidente. The Human Rights Foundation.  Retrieved on July 21, 2007.  Also see re: Francisco Usón—Political Prisoner and Prisoner of Conscience.  Human Rights Foundation.  Retrieved on July 21, 2007.)

References

External links
 
 
 The Atlantic profile
 HuffPost profile
 

1976 births
Living people
American democracy activists
American film producers
American human rights activists
HuffPost writers and columnists
Venezuelan human rights activists
Venezuelan people of Norwegian descent
Venezuelan expatriates in the United States